Snehasish Chandidas Ganguly (born 11 June 1965) is a former Indian first-class cricketer and president of the Cricket Association of Bengal. Snehasish had a career with Bengal which spanned ten years, however, he did not play internationally like his younger brother Sourav Ganguly,. After retiring from cricket, he focused on his family's printing business. Over the past 15 years, Ganguly has taken NK Gossain Printers and grown it into one of the best-known printing companies in the region. He is also a member of the Board of Directors of Lux. In 1995, Ganguly married Mohiniyatam dancer Momm Ganguly. The couple had a daughter, Sneha, in 1998. He became the president of the Cricket Association of Bengal in October 2022.

References

External links
 

1968 births
Living people
Indian cricketers
Bengal cricketers
East Zone cricketers
Bengali cricketers
Indian cricket administrators
Presidents of the Cricket Association of Bengal